Roman Malov (born September 24, 1977) is a former Russian professional ice hockey player who played in the Russian Superleague (RSL). Malov was drafted in the seventh round of the 1996 NHL Entry Draft by the Philadelphia Flyers and he played one season of junior hockey in North America for the Kingston Frontenacs of the Ontario Hockey League. He played nine seasons in the RSL for Stroitel Karaganda, Avangard Omsk, HC Spartak Moscow, Torpedo Nizhny Novgorod, Severstal Cherepovets, and Traktor Chelyabinsk.

References

External links

1977 births
Living people
Avangard Omsk players
HC Spartak Moscow players
Kingston Frontenacs players
People from Novocheboksarsk
Philadelphia Flyers draft picks
Russian ice hockey forwards
Severstal Cherepovets players
Torpedo Nizhny Novgorod players
Traktor Chelyabinsk players
Sportspeople from Chuvashia